John Wyndham Parkes Lucas Beynon Harris (10 July 1903 – 11 March 1969) was an English science fiction writer best known for his works published under the pen name John Wyndham, although he also used other combinations of his names, such as John Beynon and Lucas Parkes. Some of his works were set in post-apocalyptic landscapes. His best known works include The Day of the Triffids (1951), filmed in 1962, and The Midwich Cuckoos (1957), which was filmed in 1960 as Village of the Damned, in 1995 under the same title, and again in 2022 in Sky Max under its original title.

Wyndham was born in Warwickshire and spent most of his childhood in private education in Devon and Hampshire. He tried several careers before publishing a novel and several short stories. He saw action during World War II and went back to writing afterwards, publishing several very successful novels, and influencing a number of other writers who followed him. On the plausibility of his writing, The Guardian states his "innocuously English backdrops are central to the power of his novels, implying that apocalypse could occur at any time — or, indeed, be happening in the next village at this moment", while The Times'''s reviewer of The Day of the Triffids described it as possessing "all the reality of a vividly realised nightmare." Wyndham married Grace Wilson in 1963; he had known her for more than 30 years. They lived in Petersfield, Hampshire, where he died in 1969.

Early life
Wyndham was born in the village of Dorridge near Knowle, Warwickshire (now West Midlands), England, the son of George Beynon Harris, a barrister, and Gertrude Parkes, the daughter of a Birmingham ironmaster.

His early childhood was spent in Edgbaston in Birmingham, but when he was 8 years old his parents separated. His father then attempted to sue the Parkes family for "the custody, control and society" of his wife and family, in an unusual and high-profile court case, which he lost. Following this, Gertrude left Birmingham to live in a series of boarding houses and spa hotels. He and his younger brother, the writer Vivian Beynon Harris, spent the rest of their childhoods at a number of English preparatory and public schools, including Blundell's School in Tiverton, Devon, during the First World War. His longest and final stay was at Bedales School, near Petersfield in Hampshire (1918–21), which he left at the age of 18.

Early career
After leaving school, Wyndham tried several careers, including farming, law, commercial art and advertising; however, he mostly relied on an allowance from his family to survive. He eventually turned to writing for money in 1925.  In 1927 he published a detective novel, The Curse of the Burdens, as by John B. Harris, and by 1931 he was selling short stories and serial fiction to American science fiction magazines. His debut short story, "Worlds to Barter", appeared under the pen name John B. Harris in 1931. Subsequent stories were credited to 'John Beynon Harris' until mid-1935, when he began to use the pen name John Beynon.  Three novels as by Beynon were published in 1935/36, two of them works of science fiction, the other a detective story.  He also used the pen name Wyndham Parkes for one short story in the British Fantasy Magazine in 1939, as John Beynon had already been credited for another story in the same issue.
During these years he lived at the Penn Club, London, which had been opened in 1920 by the remaining members of the Friends Ambulance Unit, and which had been partly funded by the Quakers. The intellectual and political mixture of pacifists, socialists and communists continued to inform his views on social engineering and feminism. At the Penn Club he met his future wife, Grace Wilson, a teacher. They embarked on a long-lasting love affair, and obtained adjacent rooms in the club, but for many years did not marry, partly because of the marriage bar under which Wilson would have lost her position.

Second World War
During the Second World War, Wyndham first served as a censor in the Ministry of Information. He drew on his experiences as a firewatcher during the London Blitz and as a member of the Home Guard in The Day of the Triffids.

He then joined the British Army, serving as a corporal cipher operator in the Royal Corps of Signals. He participated in the Normandy landings, landing a few days after D-Day. He was attached to XXX Corps, which took part in some of the heaviest fighting, including surrounding the trapped German army in the Falaise Pocket.

His wartime letters to his long-time partner, Grace Wilson, are now held in the Archives of the University of Liverpool. He wrote at length of his struggles with his conscience, his doubts about humanity and his fears of the inevitability of further war. He also wrote passionately about his love for her and his fears that he would be so tainted she would not be able to love him when he returned.

Postwar
After the war Wyndham returned to writing, still using the pen name John Beynon.  Inspired by the success of his younger brother Vivian Beynon Harris, who had four novels published starting in 1948, he altered his writing style and, by 1951, using the John Wyndham pen name for the first time, he wrote the novel The Day of the Triffids. His pre-war writing career was not mentioned in the book's publicity and people were allowed to assume that this was a first novel from a previously unknown writer. The book had an enormous success and established Wyndham as an important exponent of science fiction.

He wrote and published six more novels under the name John Wyndham, the name he used professionally from 1951 onwards. His novel The Outward Urge (1959) was credited to John Wyndham and Lucas Parkes, but Lucas Parkes was another pseudonym for Wyndham himself. Two story collections, Jizzle and The Seeds of Time, were published in the 1950s under Wyndham's name, but included several stories originally published as by John Beynon before 1951.

Critical reception
John Wyndham's reputation rests mainly on the first four of the novels published in his lifetime under that name. The Day of the Triffids remains his best-known work, but some readers consider that The Chrysalids was really his best. This is set in the far future of a post-nuclear dystopia where genetic stability is compromised and women are severely oppressed if they give birth to "mutants". David Mitchell, author of Cloud Atlas, wrote of it: "One of the most thoughtful post-apocalypse novels ever written. Wyndham was a true English visionary, a William Blake with a science doctorate."

The ideas in The Chrysalids are echoed in The Handmaid's Tale, whose author, Margaret Atwood, has acknowledged Wyndham's work as an influence. She wrote an introduction to a new edition of Chocky in which she states that the intelligent alien babies in The Midwich Cuckoos entered her dreams.

Wyndham also wrote several short stories, ranging from hard science fiction to whimsical fantasy. Several have been filmed: "Consider Her Ways", "Random Quest", "Dumb Martian", "A Long Spoon", "Jizzle" (filmed as "Maria") and "Time to Rest" (filmed as No Place Like Earth). There is also a radio version of "Survival".

Brian Aldiss, another British science fiction writer, disparagingly labelled some of Wyndham's novels as "cosy catastrophes", especially The Day of the Triffids. This became a cliche about his work, but it has been rebutted by many more recent critics. L.J. Hurst commented that in Triffids the main character witnesses several murders, suicides and misadventures, and is frequently in mortal danger himself. Atwood wrote: "...one might as well call World War II—of which Wyndham was a veteran—a 'cozy' war because not everyone died in it."

Many other writers have acknowledged Wyndham's work as an influence on theirs, including Alex Garland, whose screenplay for 28 Days Later draws heavily on The Day of the Triffids.

Personal life
In 1963, he married Grace Isobel Wilson, whom he had known for more than thirty years. They lived near Petersfield, Hampshire, just outside the grounds of Bedales School. The couple remained married until he died.

Death and posthumous events
He died in 1969, aged 65, at his home in Petersfield. He was outlived by his wife and his brother.

Subsequently, some of his unsold work was published and his earlier work was republished. His archive was acquired by the University of Liverpool.

On 24 May 2015, an alley in Hampstead that appears in The Day of the Triffids was formally named Triffid Alley as a memorial to him.

Works
Early pseudonymous novels
 The Curse of the Burdens (1927), as by John B. Harris: Aldine Mystery Novels No. 17 (London: Aldine Publishing Co. Ltd)
 The Secret People (1935), as by John Beynon
 Foul Play Suspected (1935), as by John Beynon
 Planet Plane (1936), as by John Beynon; republished as The Space Machine and as Stowaway to Mars Love in Time (1946), as by Johnson Harris

Novels published in his lifetime as by John Wyndham
 The Day of the Triffids (1951), also known as Revolt of the Triffids The Kraken Wakes (1953), published in the U.S. as Out of the Deeps The Chrysalids (1955), published in the U.S. as Re-Birth The Midwich Cuckoos (1957), filmed twice as Village of the Damned, and also as a Sky Max TV serial in 2022
 The Outward Urge (1959), as by John Wyndham and Lucas Parkes
 Trouble with Lichen (1960)
 Chocky (1968)

Posthumously published novels
 Web (1979)
 Plan for Chaos (2009)

Short story collections published in his lifetime
 Jizzle (1954) ("Jizzle", "Technical Slip", "A Present from Brunswick", "Chinese Puzzle", "Esmeralda", "How Do I Do?", "Una", "Affair of the Heart", "Confidence Trick", "The Wheel", "Look Natural, Please!", "Perforce to Dream", "Reservation Deferred", "Heaven Scent", "More Spinned Against")
 The Seeds of Time (1956) ("Chronoclasm", "Time to Rest", "Meteor", "Survival", "Pawley's Peepholes", "Opposite Number", "Pillar to Post", "Dumb Martian", "Compassion Circuit", "Wild Flower")
 Tales of Gooseflesh and Laughter (1956), U.S. edition featuring stories from the two earlier collections
 Consider Her Ways and Others (1961) ("Consider Her Ways", "Odd", "Oh, Where, Now, is Peggy MacRaffery?", "Stitch in Time", "Random Quest", "A Long Spoon")
 The Infinite Moment (1961), U.S. edition of Consider Her Ways and Others, with two stories dropped, two others added

Posthumously published collections
 Sleepers of Mars (1973), a collection of five stories originally published in magazines in the 1930s: "Sleepers of Mars", "Worlds to Barter", "Invisible Monster", "The Man from Earth" and "The Third Vibrator"
 The Best of John Wyndham (1973)
  Wanderers of Time (1973), a collection of five stories originally published in magazines in the 1930s: "Wanderers of Time", "Derelict of Space", "Child of Power", "The Last Lunarians" and "The Puff-ball Menace" (aka "Spheres of Hell")
 The Man from Beyond and Other Stories (1975)
 Exiles on Asperus (1979)
 No Place Like Earth (2003)

Short stories
John Wyndham's many short stories have also appeared with later variant titles or pen names. The stories include:

 "Worlds to Barter" (1931)
 "The Lost Machine" (1932)
 "The Stare" (1932)
 "The Venus Adventure" (1932)
 "Exiles on Asperus" (1933)
 "Invisible Monster" (1933)
 "Spheres of Hell" (1933) [as by John Beynon]
 "The Third Vibrator" (1933)
 "Wanderers of Time" (1933) [as by John Beynon]
 "The Man from Earth" (1934)
 "The Last Lunarians" (1934) [as by John Beynon]
 "The Moon Devils" (1934) [as by John Beynon Harris]
 "The Cathedral Crypt" (1935) [as by John Beynon Harris]
 "The Perfect Creature" (1937)
 "Judson's Annihilator" (1938) [as by John Beynon]
 "Child of Power" (1939) [as by John Beynon]
 "Derelict of Space" (1939) [as by John Beynon]
 "The Trojan Beam" (1939)
 "Vengeance by Proxy" (1940) [as by John Beynon]
 "Meteor" (1941) [as by John Beynon]
 "Living Lies" (1946) [as by John Beynon]
 "Technical Slip" (1949) [as by John Beynon]
 "Jizzle" (1949)
 "Adaptation" (1949) [as by John Beynon]
 "The Eternal Eve" (1950)
 "Pawley's Peepholes" (1951)
 "The Red Stuff" (1951)
 "Tyrant and Slave-Girl on Planet Venus" (1951) [as by John Beynon]
 "And the Walls Came Tumbling Down" (1951)
 "A Present from Brunswick" (1951)
 "Bargain from Brunswick" (1951)
 "Pillar to Post" (1951)
 "The Wheel" (1952)
 "Survival" (1952)
 "Affair of the Heart" (1952)
 "Dumb Martian" (1952)
 "Time Out" (1953)
 "Close Behind Him" (1953)
 "Time Stops Today" (1953)
 "Chinese Puzzle" (1953)
 "Chronoclasm' (1953)
 "Reservation Deferred' (1953)
 "More Spinned Against" (1953)
 "Confidence Trick' (1953)
 "How Do I Do?" (1953)
 "Una" (1953)
 "Esmeralda" (1954)
 "Heaven Scent" (1954)
 "Look Natural, Please!" (1954)
 "Never on Mars" (1954)
 "Perforce to Dream" (1954)
 "Opposite Numbers" (1954)
 "Compassion Circuit" (1954)
 "Wild Flower" (1955)
 "Consider Her Ways" (1956)
 "The Day of the Triffids" (1957) [an excerpt from the novel]
 "But a Kind of Ghost" (1957)
 "The Meddler" (1958)
 "A Long Spoon" (1960)
 "Odd" (1961)
 "Oh, Where, Now, Is Peggy MacRafferty?" (1961)
 "Random Quest" (1961)
 "Stitch in Time" (1961)
 "It's a Wise Child" (1962)
 "Chocky" (1963)
 "From The Day of the Triffids" (1964)
 "In Outer Space There Shone a Star" (1965)
 "A Life Postponed" (1968)
 "Phase Two" (1973) [an excerpt]
 "Vivisection" (2000) [as by J. W. B. Harris]
 "Blackmoil" (2003)
 "The Midwich Cuckoos" (2005) [with Pauline Francis]

Notes
 Explanatory notes 

 Citations 

 General and cited references 
 
 Harris, Vivian Beynon, "My Brother, John Wyndham: A Memoir"  transcribed and edited by David Ketterer, in Foundation: The International Review of Science Fiction 28 (Spring 1999) pp. 5–50
 
 Ketterer David, "Questions and Answers: The Life and Fiction of John Wyndham" in The New York Review of Science Fiction 16 (March 2004) pp. 1, 6–10
 Ketterer, David, "The Genesis of the Triffids" in The New York Review of Science Fiction 16 (March 2004) pp. 11–14
 Ketterer, David, "John Wyndham and the Sins of His Father: Damaging Disclosures in Court" in Extrapolation 46 (Summer 2005) pp. 163–188
 .
 Ketterer, David,  A Part of the ... Family': John Wyndham's The Midwich Cuckoos' as Estranged Autobiography  in Learning from Other Worlds: Estrangement, Cognition and the Politics of Science Fiction and Utopia edited by Patrick Parrinder (Liverpool: University of Liverpool Press, 2001) pp. 146–177
 Ketterer, David, "When and Where Was John Wyndham Born?" in Foundation: The International Review of Science Fiction 42 (Summer 2012/13) pp. 22–39
 Ketterer, David, "John Wyndham (1903[?]–1969)"  in The Literary Encyclopedia (online, 7 November 2006)
 Ketterer, David, "John Wyndham: The Facts of Life Sextet" in A Companion to Science Fiction edited by David Seed (Oxford: Blackwell, 2003) pp. 375–388
 Ketterer, David, "John Wyndham's World War III and His Abandoned Fury of Creation Trilogy" in Future Wars: The Anticipations and the Fears edited by David Seed (Liverpool: Liverpool University Press, 2012) pp. 103–129
 Ketterer, David, "John B. Harris's Mars Rover on Earth" in Science Fiction Studies 41 (July 2014) pp. 474–475

External links

 
 
 

1903 births
1969 deaths
20th-century English male writers
20th-century English novelists
20th-century pseudonymous writers
British Army personnel of World War II
British Home Guard soldiers
English short story writers
English horror writers
English male non-fiction writers
English male novelists
English science fiction writers
People educated at Blundell's School
People educated at Bedales School
People educated at Shardlow Hall
People from Birmingham, West Midlands
People from Petersfield
Royal Corps of Signals soldiers